Panama competed at the 1960 Summer Olympics in Rome, Italy.

Wrestling

References
Official Olympic Reports

Nations at the 1960 Summer Olympics
1960
1960 in Panamanian sport